Sewallis Edward Shirley, 10th Earl Ferrers KStJ (24 January 1847 – 26 July 1912), styled Viscount Tamworth until 1859, was a British peer. He was the son of Washington Sewallis Shirley, 9th Earl Ferrers and Lady Augusta Annabella Chichester.

Ferrers was educated at Trinity College, Cambridge, where he took a B.A. in 1867 and an M.A. in 1871. He was appointed a deputy lieutenant of Derbyshire and, on 8 February 1869, of Staffordshire. Ferrers was also commissioned a lieutenant in the Staffordshire Yeomanry cavalry on 8 February 1868. He resigned his commission in 1871.

He was appointed a Knight of the Most Venerable Order of the Hospital of St. John of Jerusalem (K.St.J.) and was Justice of the Peace (J.P.) for Derbyshire.

On 24 October 1885, at St George's, Hanover Square, he married Lady Ina Maude Hedges-White, daughter of William Hedges-White, 3rd Earl of Bantry and Jane Herbert.

The 10th Earl Ferrers died at age 65; his marriage was childless. He was succeeded by Walter Shirley, 11th Earl Ferrers.

References

External links

1847 births
1912 deaths
Alumni of Trinity College, Cambridge
Staffordshire Yeomanry officers
Deputy Lieutenants of Derbyshire
Deputy Lieutenants of Staffordshire
10
Knights of the Order of St John